Klaus Conrad (19 June 1905 in Reichenberg – 5 May 1961 in Göttingen) was a German neurologist and psychiatrist with important contributions to neuropsychology and psychopathology. He joined the  Nazi Party (NSDAP) in 1940. He was best known as a professor of psychiatry and neurology, and director of the University Psychiatric Hospital in Göttingen from 1958 until his death.

His main work: Die beginnende Schizophrenie. Versuch einer Gestaltanalyse des Wahns (1958), describes the early state of schizophrenia and the typical schizophrenic aspects. From this monograph, terms as "Trema", "Apophänie" (apophany), and "Überstieg" were coined. Frank Fish, who had reviewed Conrad's book in 1960, used Conrad's approach in a neuropsychiatric case report the same year.  An English language summary of Conrad's work and its influence was published in 2010 by Mishara.

References

1905 births
1961 deaths
German psychiatrists
Nazi Party members
Physicians in the Nazi Party
Neuropsychologists
German neurologists
Schizophrenia researchers